Abdoulaye Ibrahima Toungara (born 21 June 1999) is a Malian professional footballer who plays as a forward for Flamurtari Vlorë.

Career
After beginning his youth career with hometown club Centre Salif Keita, Toungara joined the Kouka Sports Academy of Tunisia in 2010. Three years later, he returned to Centre Salif Keita. In 2017, Toungara joined Macedonian First Football League side Shkëndija. Initially signed on trial, he secured a contract and remained with the club until his 18th birthday. Later in 2017, Flamurtari Vlorë of the Albanian Superliga completed the signing of Toungara. He made his bow for the club on 13 September, featuring for the full ninety minutes of an Albanian Cup first round first leg victory away to Dinamo Tirana.

In the return tie, on 27 September, Toungara netted his first goal for Flamurtari Vlorë as his side ran out 6–1 winners on aggregate. He subsequently scored three further goals in the 2017–18 Albanian Cup. On 9 December, Toungara made his professional league debut during a Superliga victory versus Vllaznia Shkodër. In his second pro league appearance, versus Kamza on 22 December, Toungara scored for the first time in league football after netting in injury time of a 0–3 win. In January 2018, Toungara was signed on loan by Football Superleague of Kosovo side Liria Prizren. He returned to Flamurtari Vlorë in July 2018.

Personal life
Toungara's brother, Aboubacar Ibrahim Toungara, is also a footballer.

Career statistics
.

References

External links

1999 births
Living people
Sportspeople from Bamako
Malian footballers
Association football forwards
Malian expatriate footballers
Expatriate footballers in Albania
Expatriate footballers in Kosovo
Malian expatriate sportspeople in Albania
Malian expatriate sportspeople in Kosovo
Kategoria Superiore players
Football Superleague of Kosovo players
Flamurtari Vlorë players
KF Liria players
21st-century Malian people